Ground snake can refer to three distinct genera of snakes:

Genus Atractus, South American ground snakes.
Genus Lygophis
Genus Sonora, North American ground snakes.

It can also refer to a species of snake:

Magliophis exiguus

Animal common name disambiguation pages